Dublin Clontarf was a parliamentary constituency represented in Dáil Éireann, the lower house of the Irish parliament or Oireachtas from 1977 to 1981. The constituency elected 3 deputies (Teachtaí Dála, commonly known as TDs) to the Dáil, using proportional representation by means of the single transferable vote (PR-STV).

History and boundaries 
A similarly named constituency existed from 1918 to 1922, for elections of the House of Commons of the United Kingdom, but the Member of Parliament elected in 1918, Richard Mulcahy, chose not to take his seat at Westminster, and joined the revolutionary First Dáil.

The Dáil constituency was created by the Electoral (Amendment) Act 1974, and used at the 1977 general election. It consisted of the Baldoyle, Clontarf, Coolock and Raheny areas of North Dublin. The constituency was abolished in 1981.

TDs

1977 general election

See also 
Dáil constituencies
Politics of the Republic of Ireland
Historic Dáil constituencies
Elections in the Republic of Ireland

References

External links 
Oireachtas Members Database

Dáil constituencies in County Dublin (historic)
Clontarf, Dublin
1977 establishments in Ireland
1981 disestablishments in Ireland
Constituencies established in 1977
Constituencies disestablished in 1981